Wollo Kombolcha Sport Club (Amharic:ወሎ ኮምቦልቻ) is a  football club based in Kombolcha, Ethiopia.

References

Football clubs in Ethiopia
Association football clubs established in 2005